Piz Pisoc is a mountain in the Sesvenna Range of the Alps, overlooking Tarasp in the Swiss canton of Graubünden. With an elevation of 3,173 metres above sea level, it is the highest summit of the Sesvenna Range west of Pass Costainas (2,251 metres) and the second highest summit of the whole range.

The east side of Piz Pisoc is part of the Swiss National Park.

See also
List of mountains of Graubünden
List of most isolated mountains of Switzerland

References

External links
 Piz Pisoc on Hikr

Mountains of Graubünden
Mountains of the Alps
Alpine three-thousanders
Mountains of Switzerland